Gurmeet Kaur Rai (born 20 June 1970) is a retired female javelin thrower from India. She set her personal best (58.64 metres) on 17 July 2000 at a meet in Bangalore, which was the national record until 2014, when it was beaten by Annu Rani.

International competitions

Career 
Gurmeet Kaur represented the country at javelin meets internationally, and was a member of the Indian contingent at the Sydney Olympics 2000. She could not participate in the 2004 Olympics due to the tragic early death of her husband. She is also an employee of India's largest insurance company, the Life Insurance Corporation, and was the Assistant Administrative Officer in LIC New Delhi.

References

1970 births
Living people
Indian female javelin throwers
20th-century Indian women
20th-century Indian people
Athletes (track and field) at the 2000 Summer Olympics
Olympic athletes of India
Place of birth unknown
Athletes from Punjab, India
Asian Games medalists in athletics (track and field)
Athletes (track and field) at the 1998 Asian Games
Athletes (track and field) at the 2002 Asian Games
Asian Games bronze medalists for India
Medalists at the 1998 Asian Games
South Asian Games bronze medalists for India
South Asian Games medalists in athletics
Recipients of the Arjuna Award